Bleak Hill Park (formerly known as Short Heath Recreational Ground) is a public park in Erdington, Birmingham, UK.  It is identified by Birmingham City Council as a "green corridor".

History 
The park is named after the topographical name of the nearby area; referring to either "bleak hills" or "black hills".  Like the origin of Blakesley Hall in Yardley, three Old English words could provide the root of the word "Bleak" – one meaning "black", one meaning "to shine", and one meaning "shining, pale, or bleak".

The area was first recorded as Blakhilles in 1461.

Renovation 
In 2008, the park underwent a £100,000 transformation to remove graffiti and litter and to install sports pitches.

References 

Parks and open spaces in Birmingham, West Midlands
Erdington